The Art of the Brick is a traveling exposition of sculptures made by Nathan Sawaya using Lego building bricks. It premiered in 2007 and  continues to hold exhibitions around the world.

Exhibitions 
The Art of the Brick exclusively features sculptures made by Nathan Sawaya using Lego building bricks. Each exhibition typically features over 100 sculptures.

The sculptures include both original works as well as works of others reimagined using Lego building bricks.

Each sculpture has between approximately 4,000 to 80,000 Lego building bricks.

Some of the sculptures displayed include:
 Flyboy
 The Kiss (which uses 18,893 Lego building bricks)
 My Boy (which uses 22,590 Lego building bricks)
 Pop-up Book (which uses 19,822 Lego building bricks)
 Skulls
 The Swimmer (which uses 10,980 Lego building bricks)
 Yellow

The exhibition also sometimes includes collections of photography by Dean West with sculptures by Sawaya integrated into the photos.

History 
The Art of the Brick first premiered in 2007. It is the first traveling art exhibition to focus exclusively on sculptures made using LEGO building bricks.

Since 2007, it has toured through over 80 cities and been to each populated continent.

The locations it has been exhibited include:

 California Science Center, Los Angeles
 Federation Square, Melbourne
 Hamburg
 Israel
 Museum of Science and Industry, Chicago
 New York City
 Pacific Science Center, Seattle
 Paris
 San Francisco
 Singapore
 Taiwan
 Tampa
 Tokyo
 Zürich

Recognition 
In 2011, CNN named it a Top 10 Must-See Global Exhibition.

See also 

 A Lego Brickumentary
 The Brick Testament

References

External links 
 

Lego
Traveling exhibits
Sculpture exhibitions
Recurring events established in 2007